Celtic fusion is an umbrella term for any modern music which incorporates influences considered "Celtic", or Celtic music which incorporates modern music. It is a syncretic musical tradition which borrows freely from the perceived "Celtic" musical traditions of all the Celtic nations, as well as from all styles of popular music, it is thus sometimes associated with the Pan-Celtic movement.  Celtic fusion may or may not include authentic traditional music from any one tradition under the Celtic umbrella, but its common characteristic is the inspiration by Celtic identity.

The oldest musical tradition which fits under the label of Celtic fusion originated in the rural American south in the early colonial period and incorporated Scottish, Scots-Irish, Irish, and African American influences.  Variously referred to as roots music, American folk music, or old-time music, this tradition has exerted a strong influence on all forms of American music, including country, blues, and rock and roll.  The connections between traditional Scottish and Irish music and Rock music are deep and go back to the origins of American music.  As Elvis Costello put it:

"I started with rock n' roll and...then you start to take it apart like a child with a toy and you see there's blues and there's country...Then you go back from country into American music...and you end up in Scotland and Ireland eventually."

Another manifestation of this syncretic tendency emerged in New York City in the 1890s, as bands performing traditional Irish music for the large Irish immigrant community there began incorporating big band influences, adding brass and reed instruments and performing quicksteps, foxtrots, and other popular contemporary dance tunes.

More recently, there has been a flowering of several distinct genres of Celtic fusion.  These can be roughly broken down as follows:

Celtic reggae
The fusion of Celtic music and reggae is a hybrid started by the band Edward II and The Red Hot Polkas, an example of Celtic dub, The Trojans, an example of Celtic ska, and followed on by PaddyRasta, an example of Celtic folk reggae, and recently The Celtic Reggae Revolution who have done it to good effect. Other collaborations include The Chieftains and Ziggy Marley, Sharon Shannon and Bréag.

Celtic rock

The fusion of rock and Celtic music is perhaps the least surprising of the modern hybrids, since rock is partially based on "roots" music, which was originally based on a fusion of African, Celtic, and many other traditions. Modern Celtic rock acts like The Waterboys, Jethro Tull/ Ian Anderson, Rathkeltair, Alan Stivell, Gaelic Storm, Sinéad O'Connor, The Cranberries, The Proclaimers, Red Cardell, Peatbog Faeries, Lenahan, Lordryk, Croft No. 5, Enter the Haggis, Callanach, The Dreaming, Shooglenifty, Spirit of the West, the American Rogues, Homeland, Ashley MacIsaac, Mudmen, Wolfstone, The Paperboys and Great Big Sea, and many others have proven the genre's vitality.

Since rock music is so diverse and is influenced by virtually every other genre, the sounds of these groups vary considerably; they include everything from straight-ahead classic rock with traditional instruments to traditional songs played with rock "attitude".

Celtic pop
Celtic pop artists such as The Corrs, Nolwenn Leroy and Gwennyn incorporate pop music elements into traditional tunes.

Celtic punk

Celtic punk was essentially invented by The Pogues in the early 1980s and immediately gained popularity following the release of their first album in 1985.  It is one of the best established of the modern Celtic fusion genres, and generally includes drums, bass, guitar, and fiddle, sometimes with tin whistle, bodhran, or accordion.  The sound is typically fast with aggressive lyrics, rock beats, and melodies.

Bands in this genre include Flogging Molly, Dropkick Murphys, The Real McKenzies, Neck, Smiting Shillelagh, Flatfoot 56, The Tossers, The Vandon Arms, The Molly Maguires, Mutiny, and Black 47 (who also incorporate hip hop influences).  The genre is most popular in Ireland, Scotland, England, the United States, and Canada.

Punks singing in Celtic languages began to emerge in the late 1970s in Wales, where groups such as Ail Symudiad (Second Movement) and Y Trwynau Coch (The Red Noses) began performing in fast-paced idioms reminiscent of the Jam; a rather harder sound was adopted by Yr Anhrefn (Chaos) in the 1980s. The 2000s saw in Scotland the emergence of several Gaelic-language punk bands, such as Mill a h-Uile Rud and the genre is also represented in Brittany with the band called Les Ramoneurs de Menhirs.

Celtic hip hop
The first Celtic-identified hip hop group to gain mainstream notoriety was House of Pain, a Los Angeles based hip hop group which incorporated rhymes about the Irish-American experience into their music.  With a few exceptions, however, their actual instrumentation did not incorporate traditional "Celtic" instruments, though they did use time signatures typical of Jigs on several songs - a major deviation in a hip hop market where virtually everything is done in 4/4 time.

Marxman, an Irish-Jamaican hip hop group, whose explicitly nationalist and Marxist politics gained them notoriety and infamy in the United Kingdom in the 1980s, incorporated traditional instruments into several songs on their first album, but largely abandoned them on their second album for a more electronica- and blues-oriented sound that would later form the basis for the emergence of trip hop.

Sinéad O'Connor contributed vocals to several of Marxman's songs and even tried her hand at rapping on her 1994 album Universal Mother with a track about the Great Irish Famine (1845-1849).

Starting in 1998 Manau,  a French hip hop group of Breton origin, created the first truly consistent fusion of Celtic music and hip hop in two critically acclaimed albums incorporating a wide range of traditional instruments and melodies and combining them with hip hop beats.  In one of their songs they used part of an arrangement of a traditional tune (Tri Martolod) by Alan Stivell, and were subsequently sued by him for copyright infringement.

1998 also marked the release of Seanchai and The Unity Squad's second album, Rebel Hip Hop.  The sound was equal parts folk-punk, rock, and old-school hip hop and marked the first time Celtic hip hop had been performed exclusively with live instruments instead of samples. The album was selected as the Hotpress "Album of the Year" and received positive reviews but failed to break into the mainstream.  The band has released 4 more albums since and are still active, playing primarily at Rocky Sullivan's in NYC which is owned by Chris Byrne, the band leader.

 More recently, Emcee Lynx, a hip hop artist from Oakland, California of primarily Scottish and Irish descent who is best known for his anarchist politics and anti-war activism, has incorporated samples of traditional instruments into his music.  His song "I'm a Celt", from his 2003 album "The UnAmerican LP", marked his first foray into overt fusion; combining samples of a traditional Irish harp with bass, drum, and lyrics about the Highland Clearances, the famines, and growing up as a Celt in America.  In 2005 that evolved into a full band, Beltaine's Fire.  They played a live fusion of hip hop, funk, rock, and Celtic music. They released three full-length albums and their biggest performance was at the KVMR Celtic Festival in 2008, an event which drew over 10,000 people.

The definition of 'Celtic Hip Hop' is contested.  Some people use it to refer to all hip hop by self-identified Celts; Ammunition, an Irish rapper who runs https://web.archive.org/web/20080420184447/http://celtichiphop.net/ is one pillar in this camp, while most critics use it to refer to music that actually incorporates traditional instrumentation and melodies.  Rappers who spit primarily over conventional hip hop beats and self-identify with Celtic hip hop include Rob Kelly, Emcee Lynx (as a solo artist), Terrawrizt, MetaBeats, Collie, Scattabrainz, Lineage, Corvid and many more.

Celtic New Age
Celtic New Age artists such as Enya, Clannad, Afro Celt Sound System, Catya Maré, Iona, and Gary Stadler  incorporate traditional melodies and lyrics with synths and pads to create a mellow relaxed fusion that has proven highly marketable. Enya, for example, is one of the best-selling musicians in the world.

Celtic jazz
The word first entered the English language as slang and was used to describe anyone who was giving a passionate performance, primarily athletes at first.  It was only later that the spelling was standardized as Jazz and it became associated with a specific musical Genre.

The music we call Jazz today originated in African American communities and evolved out of American Roots music and the Blues and often included instruments like Fiddle and Mandolin that are now more commonly associated with Folk or Roots music.  Modern acts such as Clannad, Nightnoise, Melanie O'Reilly, and Raggle Taggle or Roland Becker (in the eighties) combine Celtic music with jazz. The jazz can range from the big band swing style to the smooth jazz style.

O'Reilly's musical  partner has a side project  called Temro that improvises over Irish  traditional music in sophisticated harmonic and rhythmic environments.

Ensemble Ériu is an Irish band which blend the minimalism and improvisatory spirit of jazz around Irish traditional melodies.

Celtic electronica
The genre of Celtic electronica blends traditional Celtic influences with modern electronic music.  Artists such as Martyn Bennett, Lorne Cousin, Mouth Music, Mark Saul and Saint Sister whose backgrounds are in traditional Celtic music tend to favor traditional instruments, melodies, and rhythms, but augment them with drum machines and electronic sounds.  Others, like Dagda, Brigid Boden and Niteworks approach the fusion from a background in electronic music that eschews traditional instruments and incorporates traditional melodies played on synths into a New Age-influenced trance sound. Peatbog Faeries have experimented with Celtic electronica, mainly on Faerie Stories.

Celtic metal

 
During the 1990s, a subgenre of folk metal emerged that combined heavy metal music with Celtic music. The pioneers of the genre were Skyclad, Cruachan, Primordial and Waylander.

Celtic-influenced world music
Many Celtic fusion artists integrate musical traditions from all over the world into their sound. The clearest example of this is Afro Celt Sound System, the members of which bring to the band strong backgrounds in either African or Irish musical tradition. The Irish fusion group Skelpin incorporates Spanish flamenco, Middle Eastern, and American soul elements and instruments into its music. Delhi 2 Dublin , a band based in Canada, is known for fusing Irish and Indian music. Salsa Celtica is an 11-member "world fusion" project based in Edinburgh, Scotland that mixes salsa with Scottish bagpiping and world influences. Other artists such as Loreena McKennitt, Red Cardell, the American Rogues, and Catya Maré take inspiration from numerous diverse traditions around the world, although their focus may be on Celtic music.

Others
Other, established hybrids include  as played by bands like again Celtic Regggae Revolution, PaddyRasta, Pubside Down, and (again) Sinéad O'Connor.

As might be expected from musicians playing a style of music defined by its fusion of disparate elements, many bands combine multiple styles.  Shooglenifty, for instance, incorporates reggae, rock, and jazz into their musical style; Croft no Five did the same with rock and funk. Bands like Na’Bodach are stylistically disparate between works on the same album, where a rock influenced song may be followed by  funk or bluegrass thereafter. Rare Air, an '80s Canadian band, had two bagpipes, with rock guitar and Caribbean-influenced drums.

Books
"Irish Folk, Trad and Blues: A Secret History" by Colin Harper (2005) covers Horslips, The Pogues, Planxty and others.
Cunliffe, Barry, ‘The Celts: A Very Short Introduction’ (Oxford, 2003). 
Maier, Bernhard, ‘The Celts: A history from earliest times to the present’, K. Windle trans, (Edinburgh University Press, Edinburgh, 2003).

See also
 List of Celtic fusion artists

References

Sources
Megaw, J. V. S. and M. R., ‘Ancient Celts and modern ethnicity’, Antiquity 70 (1996), 175-81.
Dietler, Michael, ‘Celticism, Celtitude, and Celticity: the consumption of the past in the age of globalization’, in Celtes et Gaulois, l'Archeologie face à l'histoire . vol. 1, ed. S. Rieckhoff, Bibracte, 2006, 237-48.

 
Celtic music